Wolves and Sheep is a 1953 Soviet comedy film directed by Vladimir Sukhobokov and starring Vera Pashennaya, Igor Ilyinsky and Tatyana Yeremeyeva. It is based on the 1875 play Wolves and Sheep by Aleksandr Ostrovskiy.

Cast
 Vera Pashennaya as Murzavetskaya  
 Igor Ilyinsky as Appolon Murzavetsky  
 Tatyana Yeremeyeva as Glafira Alexeyevna  
  Yelena Shatrova  as Kupavina  
 Varvara Ryzhova   as Anfisa Tikhonovna  
 Vladimir Vladislavsky 
  Vladimir Golovin

References

Bibliography 
 Prominent Personalities in the USSR. Scarecrow Press, 1968.

External links 
 

1953 films
1953 comedy films
Soviet comedy films
Russian comedy films
1950s Russian-language films
Gorky Film Studio films
Films based on works by Alexander Ostrovsky
Soviet black-and-white films